Fatima Zohra Cherif (born November 8, 1986) is an Algerian volleyball player.

Club information
Current club :  WA Tlemcen

References

External links
 

1986 births
Living people
Algerian women's volleyball players
Place of birth missing (living people)
21st-century Algerian people